Maia Lee (born January 31, 1983) is a Singaporean singer and television artiste.

Early life
Lee left secondary school at the age of 15.

Career
Lee is part of the local techno trio, The Usual Suspects, who have had three Number 1 hits on the local station WKRZ 91.3 FM: "China Girl", "The Love You Promised", and "Sunburn". "The Love You Promised" has also been released in Japan and Europe, receiving airplay as far as Scandinavia. Famed German dance group Cascada recorded a remix in December 2004.

Lee was a 7th placed in the national talent contest, Singapore Idol in Season 1.

In May 2005, Lee become a celebrity guest interviewer/writer for The New Paper, a local tabloid.

Discography

Albums
August 20, 2005: "Emotionally Advised" – Maia Lee (debut solo album)
June 2004: "Oriental Love" – "The Usual Suspects"

Compilations 
(with "The Usual Suspects")
December 2004: "Techno Party 2005 Countdown" The Love You Promised (Take On Maia remix/Cascada remix edit)
March 2005: "From Euro With Love..." The Love You Promised (candlelight remix)
March 2005: "The Downtempo Room" With You (candlelight remix)
June 29, 2005: "Quake Trance Bestシリーズ第8弾" The Love You Promised (Cascada Remix)
August 12, 2005: "Nonstop Mega Trance 1 / 电音王朝01" (The Love You Promised / 你承诺的爱, The Dj /滴接)

Singles
December 2004: "Sunburn" – The Usual Suspects ft. Maia
January 2005: "The DJ" – The Usual Suspects ft. Maia
June 2005: "Moving Along" – The Usual Suspects ft. Maia
November 2005: "Love Bites" – TV Drama "Tiramisu" Theme song
October 2006: – "Children – Sunshine Of Our Lives" – "Walking On Sunshine"
2008: "With You" – The New Romantics ft. Maia
2008: "How Do I Say It?" – The New Romantics ft. Maia

References

External links 
 Celebrity Star Blog, Straits Times Online Mobile Print (STOMP)
 

1983 births
Living people
Singaporean people of Chinese descent
Singaporean bloggers
21st-century Singaporean women singers
Singaporean singer-songwriters
Singaporean women bloggers